Fyodorovskoye is a rural locality (a village) in Karinskoye Rural Settlement, Alexandrovsky District, Vladimir Oblast, Russia. The population was 10 as of 2010. There are 2 streets.

Geography 
Fyodorovskoye is located on the Maly Kirzhach River, 12 km southeast of Alexandrov (the district's administrative centre) by road. Belteyevka is the nearest rural locality.

References 

Rural localities in Alexandrovsky District, Vladimir Oblast